Dr. Tatiana Vladimirovna Egorova (1930–2007) was a Russian botanist and author noted for working at the Saint Petersburg Botanical Garden and for editing the multi-volume Plants of Central Asia series. She described over 170 species, most in the genus Carex.

Works

References 

 1930 births
 2007 deaths
 Russian women scientists
20th-century Russian botanists
Russian women botanists